The Tainan Flower Night Market is a tourism night market in North District, Tainan, Taiwan. It is often considered to be the largest and most famous night market in the city. It is said that "South is Flower, Middle is Fengjia, North is Shihlin".

History
The night market was formally established in 1999. It is one of the youngest night markets in the city.

Overview
The Flower Night Market is open three days a week - on Thursday, Saturday and Sunday, from 5PM until midnight. It is closed on rainy days. Many kinds of foods and items are sold here, such as fried chicken, oyster omelets, beef rolls, scallion pancakes, takoyaki, eel noodles, bubble milk tea, clothes, dolls, mobile phone cases, lighters, and many others. Arcade games such as basketball machines, ring tossing, and balloon shooting can be seen here.

Most famous foods
 Bubble tea
 Candied guava (醃芭樂)
 Grilled chicken steak (烤雞排)
 Oyster omelette
 Spicy duck blood (麻辣鴨血)
 Spring roll ice cream (春捲冰淇淋)
 Stinky tofu
 Winter melon drink (冬瓜茶)

See also
Night markets in Taiwan
List of night markets in Taiwan

References

External links

TTNews - Tainan Garden Night Market
Taiwan News Online - Panel names Liuho, Shilin 'most gorgeous' night markets

1999 establishments in Taiwan
Buildings and structures in Tainan
Night markets in Taiwan
Tourist attractions in Tainan